The Manus masked owl (Tyto manusi) is a barn owl endemic to Manus Island in the Admiralty Islands. Some authors consider it a subspecies of Australian masked owl (Tyto novaehollandiae).

It is a poorly known forest-dwelling species, which is rarely seen. Comparison with the closely related Australian masked owl indicates it is likely to have large territories, and the population may be smaller than 1000.

References

External links
BirdLife Species Factsheet.

Manus masked owl
Birds of the Admiralty Islands
Manus masked owl